Karkbel is a census Town and a Nagar Parishad in Narshingpur in the state of Madhya Pradesh, India.

Geography 
Karkbel is located at 22.99029°N 79.32440°E. It has an average elevation of 397 metres (1,265 feet). Karakbel is located at about 329 km from Bhopal, the capital of the state, and 17 km from Narshingpur.

Demographics 
Karakbel has a population of 5,679 in census of 2011. The male constitutes 62% population and female constitutes 38% of population.17% of population is under 6 years.

References

Villages in Narsinghpur district